Aleksandr Vladimirovich Zaslavsky (born 13 July 1996) is a Russian football player.

Club career
He made his debut in the Russian Football National League for FC Tyumen on 28 September 2015 in a game against FC Gazovik Orenburg.

References

External links
 Profile by Russian Football National League

1996 births
Sportspeople from Omsk
Living people
Russian footballers
FC Tyumen players
FC Irtysh Omsk players
Association football midfielders
Association football forwards